Bazaria is a genus of snout moths. It was described by Émile Louis Ragonot in 1887 and is known from China, Turkmenistan, and Spain.

Species
 Bazaria djiroftella Amsel, 1959
 Bazaria dulanensis Y.L. Du & L. Yan, 2009
 Bazaria expallidella Ragonot, 1887
 Bazaria fulvofasciata Rothschild, 1915
 Bazaria gilvella (Ragonot, 1887)
 Bazaria lixiviella (Erschoff, 1874)
 Bazaria nomiella (Ragonot, 1887)
 Bazaria pempeliella Ragonot, 1893
 Bazaria polichomriella Amsel, 1970
 Bazaria ruscinonella Ragonot, 1888
 Bazaria sieversi (Christoph, 1877)
 Bazaria turensis Ragonot, 1887
 Bazaria umbrifasciella (Ragonot, 1887)
 Bazaria venosella Asselbergs, 2009

References

, 2009: First record of the genus Bazaria Ragonot from China, with description of a new species (Lepidoptera: Pyralidae: Phycitinae). Transactions of the American Entomological Society 135 (3): 377-382. .

Phycitini
Pyralidae genera
Taxa named by Émile Louis Ragonot